The CBC Jarvis Street Tower was a 160 m (540 ft) free-standing lattice tower built in 1952 to provide radio transmission facilities to the city of Toronto, Ontario, Canada. It was the second tallest freestanding structure in Canada for several years and the second tallest freestanding lattice tower ever built in Canada after the Cambridge Bay LORAN Tower. In addition it was tallest structure in Toronto for 15 years until the completion of the TD Tower in 1967. Owned by the Canadian Broadcasting Corporation, the tower was located at 345 Jarvis Street in the Church and Wellesley neighbourhood of Toronto.

The tower was used by CBC stations CBL-FM, CBLT and CBLFT, as well as CJRT and CICA-TV, until 1976, when almost all broadcast signals in Toronto moved to the CN Tower.

The adjacent studio complex was used for CBC Toronto's radio and television operations, including CBL, which only used the studios at Jarvis Street, broadcasting from its transmitter at Hornby. After the Jarvis Street transmitter was made redundant by the CN Tower, the CBC continued to use the studio facilities at that site until moving to the Canadian Broadcasting Centre in 1992.

The tower was painted red and white as warning for aircraft as part of the requirement to warn aircraft flying near it.

The tower itself remained standing until 2002 when it was demolished to make way for the Radio City condo development.

References

See also 
List of tallest structures in Canada

Former radio masts and towers
Demolished buildings and structures in Toronto
Buildings and structures demolished in 2002
Transmitter sites in Canada
Canadian Broadcasting Corporation
Towers completed in 1952
1952 establishments in Ontario
2002 disestablishments in Ontario